Traditionally, association football clubs in the Republic of Ireland have been classified as either senior, intermediate or junior. These classifications effectively categorise clubs who compete in national, provincial and county leagues respectively,

Senior/National leagues

League of Ireland

Premier Division

First Division

Former League of Ireland clubs

Intermediate/Provincial leagues

Leinster Senior League

Senior Divisions (2022/23)

Selected others

Munster Senior League

Ulster Senior League
2022/23 clubs

Junior/County leagues

Athletic Union League (Dublin)

Cork Athletic Union League

Galway & District League
Maree Oranmore FC Oranmore             Maree 4G

Kerry District League 
Premier A

Limerick & District League

Limerick Desmond League

Mayo Association Football League

West Cork League
Premier HiSpecCars.com Premier Division

Wicklow & District Football League
Andy McEvoy Premier 1

Women's association football teams

Women's National League

Dublin Women's Soccer League

Premier League

Major League

Mayo Women's Football League

Futsal

Emerald Futsal League
2014–15

See also
 List of association football clubs in Northern Ireland

References

clubs
 
Association football
Ireland

Football clubs